Vohenstrauß (or Vohenstrauss) is a town in Germany, located in the north-eastern part of the Bavarian region Upper Palatinate. The town is situated in the district of Neustadt an der Waldnaab. It is the birthplace of Heribert Illig.

Districts
Altenstadt bei Vohenstrauß, Böhmischbruck, Oberlind, Kaimling, Roggenstein, Waldau

Mayors

 1945: F. X. Wittmann
 1945–1948: Karl Ries
 1948–1952: Erhard Wagner
 1952–1966: Hans Fuchs
 1966–1972: Otto Ries
 1972–1984: Max Steger
 1984–1986: Ernst Eichl
 1986–1994: Franz Pausch (temporary because E. Eichl was ill, elected in 1988)
 1994–2008: Josef Zilbauer
 since May 2008: Andreas Wutzlhofer

Sport
The towns association football club, SpVgg Vohenstrauß, experienced its greatests success between 1969 and 1974 when it played for five seasons in the third division Bayernliga.

Sons and daughters of the town 

 Franz Volkmar Reinhard (1753-1812), Protestant theologian, in 1792 he was appointed Oberhofprediger (first preacher) to the Saxon court in Dresden
 Heribert Illig (born 1947), German publicist and publisher

References

External links
Vohenstrauss.de

Neustadt an der Waldnaab (district)